Spandex, Lycra, or elastane is a synthetic fiber known for its exceptional elasticity. It is a polyether-polyurea copolymer that was invented in 1958 by chemist Joseph Shivers at DuPont's Benger Laboratory in Waynesboro, Virginia, US. 

The generic name "spandex", which is an anagram of the word "expands", is the preferred name in North America.

Brand names for spandex include Lycra (made by The Lycra Company, previously a division of DuPont Textiles and Interiors), Elaspan (The Lycra Company), Acepora (Taekwang Group), Creora (Hyosung), INVIYA (Indorama Corporation), ROICA and Dorlastan (Asahi Kasei), Linel (Fillattice), and ESPA (Toyobo).

History 
In the post-World War II era, DuPont Textiles Fibers Department, formed in 1952, became the most profitable division of DuPont, dominating the synthetic fiber market worldwide. At this time, women began to emerge as a significant group of consumers because of their need for underwear and hosiery. After conducting market research to find out what women wanted from textiles, DuPont began developing fibers to meet such needs—including a better fiber for women's girdles, which were commonly made of rubber at the time. 

By the 1930s, DuPont became interested in developing a synthetic elastic fiber. DuPont made its first breakthrough in the early 1950s when chemist Joseph C. Shivers used an intermediate substance to modify Dacron polyester, producing a stretchy fiber that could withstand high temperatures. Determined to find a fiber to replace rubber in garments, after nearly a decade of research, Shivers perfected the fiber in 1958 at DuPont's Benger Laboratory in Waynesboro, Virginia. Moreover, the nature of spandex allowed it to be incorporated into other garments besides girdles and undergarments.

Lycra brand 
To distinguish its brand of spandex fiber, DuPont chose the trade name Lycra (originally called Fiber K). DuPont launched an extensive publicity campaign for its Lycra brand, taking advertisements and full-page ads in top women's magazines such as Vogue, Glamour, Harper's Bazaar, Mademoiselle, McCall's, Ladies' Home Journal, and Good Housekeeping. Audrey Hepburn helped catapult the brand on and off-screen during this time; models and actresses like Joan Collins and Ann-Margret followed Hepburn's aesthetic by posing in Lycra clothing for photo shoots and magazine covers.

By the mid-1970s, with the emergence of the women's liberation movement, girdle sales began to drop as they came to be associated with anti-independence and emblematic of an era that was quickly passing away. In response, DuPont reimagined Lycra as the aerobic fitness movement emerged in the 1970s. The association of Lycra with fitness had been established at the 1968 Winter Olympic Games, when the French ski team wore Lycra garments to compete. This popularized the brand as essential athletic wear because of its flexible and lightweight material. The fiber came to be especially popular in mid-thigh-length shorts worn by cyclists.

By the 1980s, the fitness trend had reached its height in popularity and fashionistas began wearing shorts on the street. Spandex proved such a popular fiber in the garment industry that, by 1987, DuPont had trouble meeting worldwide demand. In the 1990s a variety of other items made with spandex proved popular, including a successful line of body-shaping foundation garments sold under the trade name Bodyslimmers. As the decade progressed, shirts, pants, dresses, and even shoes were being made with spandex blends, and mass-market retailers like Banana Republic were even using it for menswear.

Environmental impact 
In 2014, it was noted that most clothes containing spandex end up as non-recyclable waste once they have been worn out, because fabric blends containing spandex are difficult to recycle. This contributes to the pollution of the environment.

Production

Spandex fibers are produced in four ways: melt extrusion, reaction spinning, solution dry spinning, and solution wet spinning. All of these methods include the initial step of reacting monomers to produce a prepolymer. Once the prepolymer is formed, it is reacted further in various ways and drawn out to make the fibers.

The solution dry spinning method is used to produce over 94.5% of the world's spandex fibers. The process has five steps:
The first step is to produce the prepolymer. This is done by mixing a macroglycol with a diisocyanate monomer. The two compounds are mixed in a reaction vessel to produce a prepolymer. A typical ratio of glycol to diisocyanate is 1:2.
The prepolymer is further reacted with an equal amount of diamine. This reaction is known as chain extension reaction. The resulting solution is diluted with a solvent (dimethylacetamide) to produce the spinning solution. The solvent helps make the solution thinner and more easily handled, and then it can be pumped into the fiber production cell.
The spinning solution is pumped into a cylindrical spinning cell. In this cell, the polymer solution is forced through a metal plate called a spinneret. This causes the solution to be aligned in strands of liquid polymer. As the strands pass through the cell, they are heated in the presence of a nitrogen and solvent gas. This process causes the liquid polymer to react chemically and form solid strands.
As the fibers exit the cell, an amount of solid strands are bundled together to produce the desired thickness. 
The resulting fibers are then treated with a finishing agent which can be magnesium stearate or a polymer. This treatment prevents the fibers' sticking together and aids in textile manufacture. The fibers are then transferred through a series of rollers onto a spool.

Function 
The exceptional elasticity of spandex fibers increases the clothing's pressure comfort, enhancing the ease of body movements. Pressure comfort is the response towards clothing by the human body's pressure receptors (mechanoreceptors present in skin sensory cells). The sensation response is affected mainly by the stretch, snug, loose, heavy, lightweight, soft, and stiff structure of the material. 

The elasticity and strength (stretching up to five times its length) of spandex has been incorporated into a wide range of garments, especially in skin-tight garments. A benefit of spandex is its significant strength and elasticity and its ability to return to the original shape after stretching and faster drying than ordinary fabrics. For clothing, spandex is usually mixed with cotton or polyester, and accounts for a small percentage of the final fabric, which therefore retains most of the look and feel of the other fibers. An estimated 80% of clothing sold in the United States contained spandex in 2010.

Gallery

References

External links

 "What's That Stuff: Spandex" Chemical and Engineering News

Products introduced in 1958
1970s fashion
1980s fashion
2000s fashion
2010s fashion
Copolymers
Elastomers
Synthetic fibers
Technical fabrics
Woven fabrics